
Guachuna Lake is a lake in the Yacuma Province, Beni Department, Bolivia. At an elevation of 150 m, its surface area is 102.8 km².

References

External links
OpenStreetMap - Guachuna Lake
Google Maps - Guachuna Lake

Lakes of Beni Department